The sun gun or heliobeam is a theoretical orbital weapon, which makes use of a concave mirror mounted on a satellite, to concentrate sunlight onto a small area at the Earth's surface, destroying targets or killing through heat.

History 
In 1929, the German physicist Hermann Oberth developed plans for a space station from which a 100-metre-wide concave mirror could be used to reflect sunlight onto a concentrated point on the earth.

Later during World War II, a group of German scientists at the German Army Artillery proving grounds at Hillersleben began to expand on Oberth's idea of creating a superweapon that could utilize the sun's energy. After being questioned by officers of the United States, the Germans claimed that the sun gun could be completed within 50 or 100 years.

Uses in popular culture 

The Matt Helm film Murderers' Row, and the James Bond films Diamonds Are Forever and Die Another Day, all feature orbital weapons that focus sunlight to destructive effect on Earth.

The Resident Evil: Revelations video game depicts a satellite used to provide a city with clean energy but can, at full capacity, destroy the city or other targets.

In the TV series Scorpion episode "Sun of a Gun", Walter O'Brien and his team go to an African dictator's country to investigate a Nazi World War II sun gun project.

In the Star Wars Legends book Wedge's Gamble, Rogue Squadron commandeers an orbital solar reflector (used for power generation) to boil ocean water and generate a dangerous storm.

In the science fiction novel by René Barjavel The Ice People (French: la Nuit des temps) the doomsday device built by the gondas looks mostly inspired by the concept of the sun gun.

In Futurama episode "Crimes of the Hot", a large solar reflector meant to reduce global warming is accidentally directed at Earth.

In the Fringe episode "Brave New World", a column of concentrated sunlight is directed at Beacon Hill, Boston.

In Mobile Suit Gundam, similar weapons "Solar System" and "Solar Ray" are used in space battles.

In Grand Theft Auto Online, players can use an Orbital Cannon to kill other players.

In Neal Asher’s second Ian Cormac novel, The Line of Polity, Cormac uses the smelting mirrors of the space habitat Elysium to create a solar beam weapon.

In Wolfenstein: The New Order, a newspaper reports a new Nazi "sun gun" (Sonnengewehr).  In Wolfenstein II: The New Colossus DLC Freedom Chronicles, a Nazi commander proposes to use it to suppress the American Revolution.

See also 
 Archimedes heat ray, a purported device from antiquity which weaponized the sun's rays
 Concentrated solar power
 Space mirror
 Space-based solar power
 Solar furnace

References

Research and development in Nazi Germany
Space weapons
Weapons of mass destruction
Gun
Solar energy
Light